Marv Acton (born February 3, 1944 in Porterville, California) is a former NASCAR driver. He made 14 Winston Cup starts in his career. He had a best finish of 11th place. Among the racing Acton did before NASCAR was racing stock cars at Kearney Bowl Speedway in Fresno, California and midgets in Southern California.

Winston Cup Series career
Acton made his debut in 1971, running eleven races for fellow Porterville, California driver Dick Brooks. His first start came in the Daytona 500, where he had a nice run of 18th after an 11th place start. In eleven starts in 1971, Acton never cracked the top-10, but had a best finish of 11th at Greenville-Pickens Speedway and a pair of 12ths. He also started in the top-10 three times, the best being a 7th at Greenville-Pickens.

Acton disappeared until 1974, when he made one start at N. Wilkesboro in a personally owned car. He started 29th in the thirty-car field, but finished 26th after engine troubles.

Acton made two starts in his final season, 1977, both for Rod Osterlund. He was 23rd at Richmond and 38th at Dover.

Racing career results

Winston Cup Series

Present day
Acton owns and operates Action Engineering in Denver, NC. He primarily restores classic hot rods, builds NASCAR show car racing simulators, and has a complete fabrication shop.

References

External links
 

Living people
1944 births
People from Porterville, California
Racing drivers from California
NASCAR drivers